María Scheller Zambrano (1917 – 1944) was an Argentine composer.

Born in Buenos Aires, Scheller Zambrano received a degree from the Conservatorio Nacional Superior de Música in 1937. Her instructors there included Rafael González, Ricardo Rodríguez, and José André. Her output consisted mainly of chamber music, including a number of sonatas for piano; she also produced a piano concerto.

References

1917 births
1994 deaths
Argentine classical composers
Women classical composers
20th-century Argentine musicians
20th-century classical composers
Musicians from Buenos Aires
Date of birth missing
Date of death missing
Place of death missing
20th-century women composers
Argentine women composers